Combretum edwardsii, the Natal combretum or forest climbing bushwillow, is an uncommon forest plant endemic to the mistbelt region of eastern South Africa. It has a climbing habit and the stems may often lie prostrate on the forest floor or on cliff tops. As with some other Combretum species the leaves assume autumn colours before they are shed. The plant flowers in spring and the 4-winged fruits reach maturity in late summer.

References

 E. Pooley, 1997. Trees of Natal 
 K.C. Palgrave, 1984. Trees of Southern Africa 

ewardsii